Personal Appeal is a compilation album by American musician R. Stevie Moore. It was released on CD and LP in August 2013 on the UK label Care in the Community.

Track listing

References

2013 compilation albums
R. Stevie Moore albums